John Triplett "Jerry" Haxall (April 22, 1860 – July 9, 1939) was a college football player. On November 30, 1882, he kicked a 65-yard field goal from placement for a then record in the Princeton–Yale contest at the Polo Grounds. The record stood until 1976. Haxall later remarked "My epitaph will probably be: J. T. Haxall. Kicked a football. That's all."

Early years
John Triplett Haxall was born in Virginia on April 22, 1860 to Bolling Walker Haxall and Anne Triplett. His father was a flour milling heir whose Richmond house built in 1858 is on the National Register of Historic Places.

Notes

Endnotes

External links

American football guards
Princeton Tigers football players
American football placekickers
19th-century players of American football
1860 births
1939 deaths
Players of American football from Virginia